James "Jim" Crawford (born 1 May 1973) is a football coach and former professional player. He played as a midfielder for Bohemians, Newcastle United, Rotherham United, Dundee United, Reading, Shelbourne and Sporting Fingal. Born in the United States, he represented the Republic of Ireland at under-21 level.

Playing career
Crawford was born in Chicago, United States. He began his career at schoolboy level with Terenure Rangers before moving to Bohemians making his debut against Bray Wanderers on 3 November 1991. He soon became a big favourite at Dalymount Park and won the PFAI Young Player of the Year for the 1993–94 season.

Represented Republic of Ireland at the World Student Games in 1993.

This form attracted Newcastle United and he moved to Tyneside in 1995. While playing for Newcastle, Crawford found his first-team opportunities limited (scoring only once in a pre-season game against Derry City) and was sent out on loan to both Rotherham United and Dundee United before signing up for Reading in March 1998, with Tommy Burns at the helm. Burns was sacked and he failed to prove himself under the new managership.

Crawford's next destination was Shelbourne back in Ireland whom he helped to four League of Ireland championships. He signed a new one-year contract on 25 February 2007 with Shels as they got their preparations in place for the new First Division season following the FAI's decision to demote the reigning champions. He was swiftly appointed captain by new manager, Dermot Keely. Crawford's last seasons at Shelbourne were hampered by numerous injuries which limited his appearances. After eight immensely successful seasons at Shelbourne, Crawford departed the club in December 2007.

Crawford was quoted as saying:

Crawford joined newly formed Sporting Fingal in February 2008, though he retired through injury at the end of their first season.

Coaching career
Crawford took over as interim manager at Shamrock Rovers after Pat Scully's contract was terminated by mutual consent on 16 October 2008.

Crawford was Head Coach of the Republic of Ireland U18's from 2016-2019. He initially took charge of the home based international side which meets Wales in the John Coughlan Memorial Cup on an annual basis  Crawford took the full U18 international squad from the start of the 2016-17 campaign and he was named coach of the tournament at the Slovakia Cup in April 2017.

On 5 April 2020 he was announced as the successor to Stephen Kenny as manager of the Republic of Ireland under-21 team

Honours
Shelbourne
 League of Ireland Premier Division: 2001–02, 2003, 2004, 2006

Individual
 PFAI Young Player of the Year: 1993–94

References

External links
Jim Crawford's profile at www.shelbournefc.com

Living people
1973 births
Association football midfielders
Republic of Ireland association footballers
Republic of Ireland football managers
Republic of Ireland under-21 international footballers
Bohemian F.C. players
Newcastle United F.C. players
Rotherham United F.C. players
Dundee United F.C. players
Reading F.C. players
Shelbourne F.C. players
Sporting Fingal F.C. players
Shamrock Rovers F.C. managers
League of Ireland managers
League of Ireland players
Premier League players
English Football League players
Scottish Football League players
Soccer players from Illinois
Sportspeople from Chicago
Soccer players from Chicago